The 2020–21 San Jose State Spartans men's basketball team represented San Jose State University in the 2020–21 NCAA Division I men's basketball season. They were led by fourth-year head coach Jean Prioleau and were members of the Mountain West Conference. Due to COVID-19 restrictions in Santa Clara County, the Spartans could not play their home games at their normal home arena, Provident Credit Union Event Center, and played their "home" games at different locations.

Previous season 
The Spartans finished the season 7–24, 3–15 in Mountain West play to finish in tenth place. They lost in the first round of the Mountain West tournament to New Mexico.

Roster

Schedule and Results

|-
!colspan=9 style=| Regular season

|-
!colspan=9 style=| Mountain West tournament

Source

References

San Jose State Spartans men's basketball seasons
San Jose State
San Jose State
San Jose State